Pseudatteria is a genus of moths belonging to the family Tortricidae.

Species
Pseudatteria analoga  Obraztsov, 1966
Pseudatteria ardoris  Obraztsov, 1966
Pseudatteria bradleyi  Obraztsov, 1966
Pseudatteria buckleyi  Druce, 1901
Pseudatteria cantharopa  Meyrick, 1909
Pseudatteria chrysanthema  Meyrick, 1912
Pseudatteria cladodes  Walsingham, 1914
Pseudatteria dictyanthes  Meyrick, 1936
Pseudatteria dognini  Obraztsov, 1966
Pseudatteria fumipennis  Dognin, 1904 
Pseudatteria heliocausta  Dognin, 1912
Pseudatteria igniflora  Meyrick, 1930 
Pseudatteria leopardina  Butler, 1872
Pseudatteria maenas  Meyrick, 1924
Pseudatteria marmarantha  Meyrick, 1924
Pseudatteria molybdophanes Razowski & Wojtusiak, 2008
Pseudatteria myriocosma  Meyrick, 1930
Pseudatteria pantherina  Felder & Rogenhofer, 1875
Pseudatteria pseudomaenas  Obraztsov, 1966
Pseudatteria shafferi  Obraztsov, 1966
Pseudatteria splendens  Druce, 1901
Pseudatteria symplacota  Meyrick, 1930
Pseudatteria tremewani  Obraztsov, 1966
Pseudatteria unicana  Dognin, 1904 
Pseudatteria volcanica  Butler, 1872

References

 , 1913, Biol. Centr.-Am. Lepid. Heterocera 4: 214.
 , 2005, World Catalogue of Insects 5
 , 2010: Tortricidae (Lepidoptera) from Peru. Acta Zoologica Cracoviensia 53B (1-2): 73-159. . Full article: .

External links
tortricidae.com

 
Polyorthini
Tortricidae genera
Taxa named by Thomas de Grey, 6th Baron Walsingham